Svenska Cupen (The Swedish Cup) is a knockout cup competition in Swedish football and the main Swedish football cup. Svenska Cupen usually refers to the men's tournament, although a women's tournament is also held. Each year 96 teams compete, comprising the 16 teams from Allsvenskan and the 16 teams of Superettan together with 64 teams from lower tiers of the league system. The winners qualify for the qualifying stages of the UEFA Europa Conference League. The winner is awarded Gustaf VI Adolf Cup.

Compared to cups in many other countries, Svenska Cupen attracts considerably less public interest and even the cup final is rarely sold out. Consequently, the Swedish Football Association has experimented with the format in order to raise the profile of the cup. The final has been staged at a neutral venue, at the national stadium as well as being played as a two-leg match.

Svenska Cupen was first held in 1941. The current holders of Svenska Cupen are Malmö FF who beat Hammarby IF in the 2022 final. Malmö FF are the most successful club of the competition having won 15 titles, the latest in 2022.

Rounds and teams

The winner of Svenska Cupen qualifies for the first qualification round of the UEFA Europa League. The qualification spot is awarded to the fourth positioned team in Allsvenskan if the winner is already qualified for the UEFA Europa League or the UEFA Champions League.

How district teams qualify
There are a number of districts in the Swedish football organization, and each of them receives a number of spots in Svenska Cupen, due to how many eleven-player teams and nine-player teams the district has in the leagues. The only three associations of the Swedish District Football Associations that has a qualifying round to 2015–16 Svenska Cupen are Dalarnas FF and Örebro Läns FF, the other district decides their teams by Distriktsmästerskap (District Championships) or by club ranking 2014. Only teams in Division 1 or lower are included, because teams in Allsvenskan and Superettan are automatically qualified for Round 2.

Ranking

This is the number of places each of the districts will have in the first round of the 2015–16 Svenska Cupen. Updated as of 31 May 2015.

Winners

Broadcasting rights
Turner Sports has previously been the rights holder of the Swedish Cup in the United States.

References

External links
 Swedish Football Association
Svenska Cupen - SOCCERWAY

 
1
Sweden
1941 establishments in Sweden
Recurring sporting events established in 1941